Ensifer, sword-bearer in Latin, may refer to:
 Spatharios, a type of Roman body guards
 Ensifer (bacterium), a genus of nitrogen-fixing bacteria

See also
 Ensifera
 Ensiferum, a Finnish folk metal band